Marine Bolliet (born 14 January 1988) is a former French biathlete. She competed at the Biathlon World Cup in 2010-11, 2011-12, 2012-13, 2013-14, and at the 2014 Winter Olympics in Sochi.

References

External links

1988 births
Living people
Biathletes at the 2014 Winter Olympics
French female biathletes
Olympic biathletes of France
Université Savoie-Mont Blanc alumni
21st-century French women